Bodo Schmidt (born September 3, 1967 in Niebüll) is a German football coach and a former player who manages SV Frisia 03 Risum-Lindholm.

Honours
 UEFA Cup finalist: 1993
 Bundesliga: 1995, 1996; runner-up 1992
 DFL-Supercup: 1995

References

External links
 

Living people
1967 births
People from Nordfriesland
Association football defenders
German footballers
German football managers
FC Bayern Munich II players
SpVgg Unterhaching players
Borussia Dortmund players
1. FC Köln players
FC Viktoria Köln players
1. FC Magdeburg players
Bundesliga players
Footballers from Schleswig-Holstein
West German footballers